The Naptholette was a French automobile manufactured only in 1899.  A 2½ hp light car similar to the Decauville, its body could be "removed in an instant and another one substituted".

References

Defunct motor vehicle manufacturers of France